Porthleven and Helston South was an electoral division of Cornwall in the United Kingdom which returned one member to sit on Cornwall Council from 2009 to 2013. The sole Councillor was Andrew Wallis, an Independent.

The division covered 1,235 hectares in total. It was abolished by the Cornwall (Electoral Changes) Order 2011, and Wallis went on to be elected as Councillor for Porthleven and Helston West.

Election results

2009 election

References

Helston
Electoral divisions of Cornwall Council